A quantum fluid refers to any system that exhibits quantum mechanical effects at the macroscopic level such as superfluids, superconductors, ultracold atoms, etc. Typically, quantum fluids arise in situations where both quantum mechanical effects and quantum statistical effects are significant.

Most matter is either solid or gaseous (at low densities) near absolute zero. However, for the cases of helium-4 and its isotope helium-3, there is a pressure range where they can remain liquid down to absolute zero because the amplitude of the quantum fluctuations experienced by the helium atoms is larger than the inter-atomic distances.

In the case of solid quantum fluids, it is only a fraction of its electrons or protons that behave like a “fluid”. One prominent example is that of superconductivity where quasi-particles made up of pairs of electrons and a phonon act as bosons which are then capable of collapsing into the ground state to establish a supercurrent with a resistivity near zero.

Derivation

Quantum mechanical effects become significant for physics in the range of the de Broglie wavelength. For condensed matter, this is when the de Broglie wavelength of a particle is greater than the spacing between the particles in the lattice that comprises the matter.
The de Broglie wavelength associated with a massive particle is

where h is the Planck constant. The momentum can be found from the kinetic theory of gases, where

Here, the temperature can be found as

Of course, we can replace the momentum here with the momentum derived from the de Broglie wavelength like so:

Hence, we can say that quantum fluids will manifest at approximate temperature regions where , where d is the lattice spacing (or inter-particle spacing). Mathematically, this is stated like so:

It is easy to see how the above definition relates to the particle density, n. We can write

The above temperature limit  has different meaning depending on the quantum statistics followed by each system, but generally refers to the point at which the system manifests quantum fluid properties. For a system of fermions,  is an estimation of the Fermi energy of the system, where processes important to phenomena such as superconductivity take place. For bosons,  gives an estimation of the Bose-Einstein condensation temperature.

See also 
 Bose–Einstein condensate
 Superconductivity
 Superfluidity
 Classical fluid
 Liquid helium
 Fermi liquid
 Luttinger liquid
 Quantum spin liquid
 Macroscopic quantum phenomena
 Topological order

References

Condensed matter physics
Quantum phases
Exotic matter